Lo-Key? is an American hip hop/R&B band that formed in Kansas City, Missouri and Minneapolis, Minnesota. Their single, "I Got a Thang 4 Ya!" (1993), reached No. 1 on the Billboard Hot R&B Singles chart, and No. 27 on the Hot 100.

History
Lo-Key? formed in Kansas City, Missouri and Minneapolis, Minnesota, consisting of singer/trumpeter Darron "D" Story, singer/multi-instrumentalist Andre "Dre" Shepard, bassist Tyrone "T-Bone" Yarbrough,  producer/keyboardist Lance Alexander and rapper/singer Tony "Prof-T" Tolbert. The group honed their skills around the Minneapolis club circuit, where  Alexander and Tolbert became in-house producers for Jimmy Jam & Terry Lewis' Flyte Tyme Productions. The group signed to Jam & Lewis' record label, Perspective Records, and released their debut album, Where Dey At?, on October 6, 1992. They had a hit with the single "I Got A Thang 4 Ya!" in 1992, which spent a week at No. 1 on the Billboard Hot R&B Singles chart, and reached No. 27 on the Hot 100. Arthur Jafa, director of photography for the independent film Daughters of the Dust (1991), directed the video for the single.

Alexander and Tolbert also were hitmaking songwriters and producers in their own right. Among the hit songs they've produced for other artists were "Butta Love" by the group Next, "Love Makes No Sense" for Alexander O'Neal, "I Wish" for Shanice and "Strawberries" for Smooth. Tolbert continued to work with Jimmy Jam & Terry Lewis, appearing as a songwriter and background vocalist on albums by Earth, Wind & Fire, Janet Jackson and Usher.  Lance Alexander later went on to form his own label called Baby Honey Records during which time he teamed up with Minneapolis producer Christopher Starr and formed the group V.IP. which released the single entitled Lil Mama How Ya Do Dat featuring Juvenile.

Discography

Albums
Where Dey At? (Perspective Records, 1992) No. 121 Billboard 200, No. 18 US R&B Chart
Back 2 Da House (Perspective Records, 1994) No. 64 US R&B Chart

Singles
"Kansas City" (1992)
"I Got a Thang 4 Ya!" (No. 27 Billboard Hot 100, No. 1 US R&B Singles, 1992)
"Hey There Pretty Lady" (No. 56 US R&B Singles, 1993)
"Sweet on U" (No. 91 Billboard Hot 100, No. 13 US R&B Singles, 1993)

See also
List of number-one R&B singles of 1992 (U.S.)

Avoid 
 ShadowLand Shop Unreliable, unsafe source {U.S}

References

African-American musical groups
American contemporary R&B musical groups
Musical groups from Minnesota
Musical groups from Kansas City, Missouri
Musical groups established in 1991
1991 establishments in the United States
New jack swing music groups